Iván Cuéllar Sacristán (born 27 May 1984), nicknamed Pichu, is a Spanish professional footballer who plays as a goalkeeper for Sporting de Gijón.

Formed at Atlético Madrid, he spent most of his career with Sporting de Gijón, where he made 221 total appearances.

Club career

Atlético Madrid
Cuéllar was born in Mérida, Extremadura, and earned his nickname "Pichu" – local dialect for a young boy – from a cousin. He spent time at Real Madrid before continuing his development at hometown club Mérida UD, where he made his senior debut aged 17 in a 1–0 loss away to Granada CF in Segunda División B. After completing his formation at Atlético Madrid, he made his first appearance for the first team in the last matchday of the 2004–05 season, in a 2–2 draw against neighbours Getafe CF. 

In 2006–07, benefitting from the forced absence of starter Leo Franco, Cuéllar played a further seven games, including a 0–6 home defeat to FC Barcelona on 20 May 2007.

Sporting Gijón
After a season-long loan at Segunda División club SD Eibar, featuring in all the matches save four, Cuéllar was released by Atlético (as another youth graduate in the same position, Ismael Falcón) and joined Sporting de Gijón in August 2008, on a four-year contract. After Sergio Sánchez conceded 19 goals in the season's first four games he became the starter but, after a collision with Athletic Bilbao's Carlos Gurpegui during a 3–0 away defeat on 14 December, suffered a serious ankle injury which rendered him unavailable for four months.

In mid-November 2009, as he was second choice to Juan Pablo, Cuéllar suffered another severe injury, damaging his knee in training and being lost for the vast majority of the campaign. His first appearance after recovering would take place on 22 September 2010, as manager Manuel Preciado rested the vast majority of the starters for a Wednesday match at Barcelona – in a week where all the teams played three matches – which ended in a 1–0 loss.

In January 2013, after the departure of Juan Pablo to Maccabi Tel Aviv FC, Cuéllar became the starter. He won the Ricardo Zamora Trophy for best goalkeeper in 2014–15, conceding 21 goals in 36 appearances as the Asturians returned to La Liga. At the end of the season, he extended his contract until 2018.

Leganés
Cuéllar ended his nine-year association with the El Molinón-based team in July 2017, and the 33-year-old signed for CD Leganés also in the top tier. As Jon Ander Serantes was nursing a serious injury, he took the number one position and went on to record a club and personal best clean sheet of over 500 minutes that was broken by Sevilla FC in October.

Return to Sporting
On 29 August 2021, Cuéllar returned to Sporting on a two-year contract. He was second-choice to Diego Mariño and did not play until 20 March when he profited from the latter's injury to play in a 1–1 draw at Leganés; he then had a run of ten consecutive games in which he kept only two clean sheets but never conceded more than once, as the team narrowly avoided relegation.

Honours
Spain U23
Mediterranean Games: 2005

Individual
Segunda División: Ricardo Zamora Trophy/Best Goalkeeper 2014–15

References

External links
Sporting Gijón official profile 

1984 births
Living people
People from Mérida, Spain
Sportspeople from the Province of Badajoz
Spanish footballers
Footballers from Extremadura
Association football goalkeepers
La Liga players
Segunda División players
Segunda División B players
Mérida UD footballers
Atlético Madrid B players
Atlético Madrid footballers
SD Eibar footballers
Sporting de Gijón players
CD Leganés players
Spain under-21 international footballers
Spain under-23 international footballers
Competitors at the 2005 Mediterranean Games
Mediterranean Games medalists in football
Mediterranean Games gold medalists for Spain